Eurotroll is a Swedish dubbing company based in Stockholm, the capital of Sweden. The company dubs content into a Swedish, Danish, Finnish, and Norwegian. The company is one of the few independent dubbing companies in Scandinavia. The company was founded in 1992 by Lasse Svensson. Before he founded Eurotroll, he was president of another dubbing named Media Dubb, which is unrelated to Eurotroll. The company dubs animation and videogames.

Clients
 Cartoon Network
 Sveriges Television
 Nickelodeon (Sweden)
 Warner Bros.
 TV4 (Sweden)
 AB Svensk Filmindustri
 United International Pictures
 Taffy Entertainment
 Bonnier Audio
 20th Century Fox
 TV-Loonland
 and more

Filmography

Films and programs
 Bob the Builder
 SpongeBob SquarePants
 DuckTales
 Postman Pat
 Chuggington
 Jimmy Neutron: Boy Genius
 Kiki's Delivery Service
 Het Huis Anubis
 Rugrats Go Wild
 Tom and Jerry: The Magic Ring
 Tom and Jerry: The Movie
 The SpongeBob SquarePants Movie
 Pokémon: The First Movie
 Curious George 2: Follow That Monkey!
 Batman: The Animated Series
 Garfield and Friends
 and a lot more

Video games
 Resistance 2

See also
 SDI Media Sweden
 Dubberman Sweden AB

References

External links
 Official Site

Companies based in Stockholm
Mass media companies established in 1992
Swedish dubbing companies
Mass media in Stockholm
1992 establishments in Sweden